Eloy or Eloi may refer to:

Eloy, Arizona, a city in the United States
Eloy (band), a German progressive rock band
Eloy (album), the 1971 debut album of the band
Eloy (film), a 1969 Argentine film
Eloi, a fictional race in H.G. Wells' science fiction novel The Time Machine
Eloi (name), a list of people with either the given name or surname
Eloy (given name)
Eloy (surname)

See also
Elois, a given name